The Samsung NX3000 is a rangefinder-styled digital mirrorless camera announced by Samsung on May 8, 2014.

References
http://www.dpreview.com/products/samsung/slrs/samsung_nx3000/specifications

Live-preview digital cameras
NX 3000
Cameras introduced in 2014